Apte it is an Indian surname mostly found in Maharashtrian Chitpavan Brahmins.

Arvind Apte (born 1934), Indian cricketer
Babasaheb Apte (1903–1971), an early RSS pracharak
Balavant Apte, Bal Apte or Balasaheb Apte (1939–2012), BJP politician
Devdas Apte (born 1934), Indian politician
Hari Narayan Apte (1864–1919), Marathi writer
Madhav Apte (1932-2019), Indian cricketer
Narayan Apte (1911–1949), convicted for assassination of M K Gandhi
Narayan Hari Apte (1889–1971), Marathi author and script-writer
S. S. Apte or Shivram Shankar Apte (1907–1985), RSS pracharak and founder of Vishva Hindu Parishad
Yeshwant Sitaram Apte (1909-2000) Owner of famous Lalkar Sound System and Sound Library, Pune
Radhika Apte Indian actress

Marathi-language surnames